The 71-630 is a proposed Russian low floor tram intended for Moscow and Riga. These rail vehicles are produced by Ust'-Katav Vagon-building plant (UKVZ, УКВЗ, Усть-Катавский Вагоностроительный Завод имени С. М. Кирова - Russian abbreviature and full name).
Only one car was built in 2006. It was tested with passengers in Moscow in 2008–2010, and stay in Krasnopresnenskoye depot.

References

tram vehicles of Russia